Anatoly Nikolaievich Eiramdzhan (sometimes Eiramjan; , ; January 3, 1937 – September 23, 2014) was the outstanding Russian-Armenian film director, writer and producer. Creator of the first commercial film in the USSR. Author of humorous stories and sketches.

He began his film career in the 1970s as a screenwriter. In 1989 Eiramdzhan began shooting films from his own scripts. In 1992 he founded New Odeon film studio, having become a director, screenwriter and producer of his films. For the way to shoot quickly and cheaply, he was compared to Ed Wood. At the same time, his achievements include the fact that he made many films in the conditions of the decline of the film industry in Russia in the 90s and gave many film actors the opportunity to work in their specialty.

Anatoly Eiramdzhan is the author of famous Russian comedies beloved by many viewers, which capture great Russian actors.

Biography
Eiramdzhan was born in 1937 in Baku, Azerbaijan SSR. 

His father was Nikolay Nikolaevich Ter-Grigoryan, an accomplished teacher of music and the piano. 
Anatoly Eiramdzhan's mother, whose surname was taken by Anatoly, was Arevik Nikitichna Eiramdzhan - the grand daughter of the famous Armenian writer Ghazaros Aghayan (1840–1911).

He is cousin of composer and musical and public figure Eduard Khagogortian. Nephew of painter Martiros Saryan.

His wife - Oksana Shagdar (educated as engineer-programmer) is assistant of movie director, photographer, make-up artist, actress. Her last film work - cameraman in the video for the song "Charmed, enchanted" for famous Russian singer Mikhail Zvezdinsky.

In 1961 Eiramdzhan graduated from the Azerbaijan Institute of Oil and Chemistry.

In 1972 he completed a three-year program at the Screenplay branch of the High Course of Scriptwriters and Movie Directors (conducted by I. Olshansky). After graduating he began writing movie scripts.

Eiramdzhan was also the author of short comic stories. He was honored as the winner of the prestigious "Golden Calf award" from the Russian "Literary Newspaper" for 1972 - 1973.

In 1989 Eiramdzhan began producing films from his own scripts. He was created the film studio "New Odeon" in Moscow in 1992 by Eiramdzhan to focus on creating low budget comedies. He also took on the responsibilities of screenwriter, art director and film director. During his career at film studio "New Odeon", Eiramdzhan was responsible for the creation of 22 films.

In 1995 the publishing house Author, Inc. of Moscow published Eiramdzhan's first book, titled "The Ladies' Man and Other Comedy Films".
The book includes comedy movie scripts.

In 1997, the film "The Impotent Man" was awarded the Award "Golden Demetra" at the Yalta International Film Festival, whose presidents were Emil Loteanu and Vladimir Motyl.

In 2006 the publishing house Golos-Press published his second book, titled "From Everyone One Thread".

Artwork of the book - artist Vagrich Bakhchanyan.
The book includes interesting and funny life stories, as well as several film novels and humorous stories.

In 2012 the publishing house Golos-Press published the third book, titled "The Shirt for Naked".

Artwork of the book - artist Vagrich Bakhchanyan.
The book includes stories, novels, scripts, plays - stories about cinema and for cinema. All of them are written with subtle humor, beautiful Russian language, with love for the heroes of these works. Recently, such books are very rare in Russian literature.

In 2014 the publishing house Golos-Press published the 4-th book, titled "Where is NOFELET and something else...".
The book includes stories, novels, screenplays - stories about cinema and for cinema.

Anatoly Eiramdzhan:
"Why -..." and something else. " Firstly, because in addition to the script "Where is NOFELET?," I placed two more scripts written relatively recently in the book. In "somethings else" include stories, entertaining stories "about cinema and for cinema," which I hope will be interesting to my readers."

Since 2003 Eiramdzhan lived and worked in Miami, FL with his wife Oksana Shagdar and his son Koka (Nikolay).

The name of Anatoly Eiramdzhan is well known to the Russian cinematographer, films directed by himself or other directors based on his scripts are still popular. He demonstrated and proved the possibility of the existence in Russia of an independent low-budget commercial cinema that can survive. All the films of Anatoly Eiramdzhan are not similar to either Soviet or post-Soviet comedies, they have an author's face.
Eiramdzhan's films consistently receive very high ratings and have large theater and TV audiences.

Around 15 scripts for films, the libretto of the musical "His Majesty's Occasion" (based on the biography of the great writer O. Henry) and the theater play "Lesha is to blame in all," written in the last years of his life, remained as unfulfilled projects. Many of these scripts are published in the latest books of the writer and filmmaker.

Anatoly Eiramdzhan died in Miami, Florida September 23, 2014 in the age 77 and was buried in Miami at Southern Memorial
Park.  The death came from cardiac arrest.

Filmography

 as scriptwriter
 Fellows Villager (1973) - scriptwriter
 What There is Our Life? - The Film-Almanac «Au-Uu!» (1975) scriptwriter
 Let's Meet at the Fountain (1976) - scriptwriter
 If I Would Be the Chief (1980) - scriptwriter
 Where It Will Get To?! (1981) - scriptwriter
 It Is Time of Red Apples (1981) - scriptwriter
 Travel Will Be Pleasant (1982) - scriptwriter
 Vitya Glushakov - A Friend of the Apaches (1983) - scriptwriter
 The Most Charming and Attractive (1985) - scriptwriter
 Where is the Nophelet? (1987) - scriptwriter

as director and scriptwriter
For Fine Ladies! (1989) - director, scriptwriter
The Ladies' Man (1990)  - director, scriptwriter
My Seawoman (1990) - director, scriptwriter
Real Man (Short-Footage Film) (1991) - producer, director, scriptwriter.

as producer, director and scriptwriter
New Odeon (1992)
Old Records  (1993)  (Short-Footage Film)
The Groom from Miami   (1994)
The Third is Not Superfluous (1994)
The Impotent Men (1996) (The Award"Gold Demetra", Yalta 1997)
Night Visit (1997)
When We Are Not Strange (1998)
Prima Donna Mary (1998)
The Ultimatum (1999)
The Valentine's Day (2000)
The Agent in the Miniskirt (2000)
The Mistress From Moscow (2001)
Secret Appointment (2001)
We Have Made It ! (2001)
The Son of the Loser (2002)
Easy Kiss (2002)
Arrow of Love (2002)
The Braked Reflex (2004)
To Marry at 24 hours (2004)
The Gift of Nature (2005)

Critics 

Newspaper "CULTURE":

"You can treat the work of Anatoly Eiramdzhan in different ways. Some (primarily film critics-snobs) indulgently or even contemptuously smile when it comes to his paintings. Others (primarily distributors), on the contrary, believe that he makes a strong movie, which is to the taste of the mass audience. But can't call of surprise and respect the fact that, no matter that Eiramdzhan is filming and filming. "

Newspaper "VZGLYAD":

"in the so-called intellectual environment, a good word about Anatoly Eiramdzhan was considered then and is now considered inappropriate. Despite numerous attempts, I never managed to publish a single positive paragraph about Eiramdzhan's movie in the cinematic press, although some films and some techniques of the master have always caused me admiration. In me, but not others. " (Igor Mantsov)

Weekly newspaper "Ether" (Armenia):

"The audience loves the comedies of Anatoly Eiramjan and praises them. Critics secretly watch his comedies with his whole family, but publicly, as a rule, they are viciously criticized, for that they are critics. "

The critic Igor Mantsov described Anatoly Eiramdzhan as "the most stable, accurate and professional (yea, yea!) cinematographer of the decade" (i.e. 1990s), "a true knight of low-budget cinema", who "on scanty money in a situation of complete collapse of the film industry managed to give out one movie farce after another" and in which "only the lazy person did not spit».

References

External links
Official web site Anatoly Eiramdzhan
http://www.noviyodeon.com/Eiramdzhan.html

1937 births
2014 deaths
Soviet writers
Russian writers
Writers from Baku
Soviet Armenians
Russian expatriates in the United States
Russian people of Armenian descent
Russian male writers
Soviet male writers